Ashe Mukasa (born April 1952) is a former Ugandan football midfielder who played for Uganda in the 1978 African Cup of Nations.

Career
Born in the Lungujja neighborhood of Kampala, Mukasa began his career playing with local youth sides Nateete Young Stars and Nakivubo Boys. In 1969, he joined Coffee F.C. of the first division for one season. The following season, he moved to NIC F.C. in the second division.

In 1972, Mukasa returned to the first division with Express F.C., the club where would win two league titles in five seasons.

Mukasa played for Uganda at the 1974, 1976 and 1978 African Cup of Nations finals.

References

External links

11v11 Profile

1952 births
Living people
Ugandan footballers
Uganda international footballers
Association football defenders
1974 African Cup of Nations players
1976 African Cup of Nations players
1978 African Cup of Nations players
Express FC players
Kampala Capital City Authority FC players
Sportspeople from Kampala